The Sri Lankan national cricket team toured New Zealand in the 2004–05 season.  They played 2 Test matches and 5 ODIs. New Zealand won the Test series 1–0.

Squads

ODI series

1st ODI

2nd ODI

3rd ODI

4th ODI

5th ODI

Tour matches

First-class: Major Associations XI v Sri Lankans

Test series

1st Test

2nd Test

References

External links
 Cricinfo tour page

2004 in Sri Lankan cricket
2004 in New Zealand cricket
2005 in Sri Lankan cricket
2005 in New Zealand cricket
2004–05 New Zealand cricket season
International cricket competitions in 2004–05
2004-05